Khin is a musical instrument of Nepal. 

Khin or KHIN may also refer to:

Khin (name)
Khin, Iran (disambiguation), multiple places
Khin, Kalikot, a village development committee in north-western Nepal
KHIN, a TV station of Iowa PBS network, U.S.

See also
Khin-U, a town in Myanmar
Khin-U Township, in Myanmar